Moukalaba-Doudou National Park is a national park in Gabon. The national park includes various habitat types, including humid rain forest and savannah grasslands.

The WWF started a development programme in the park in 1996.

World Heritage Status 
This site was added to the UNESCO World Heritage Tentative List on October 20, 2005, in the Mixed (Cultural & Natural) category.

References

External links 
Virtual Tour of the National Parks

National parks of Gabon
Protected areas established in 2002
2002 establishments in Gabon
Western Congolian forest–savanna mosaic